Martin Laas (born 15 September 1993) is an Estonian cyclist, who currently rides for UCI WorldTeam . In October 2020, he was named in the startlist for the 2020 Vuelta a España.

Major results

2013
 3rd Time trial, National Under-23 Road Championships
 3rd Riga Grand Prix
2014
 1st Grand Prix de Lignac
 4th Overall Baltic Chain Tour
2015
 1st  Overall Tour of Estonia
1st  Points classification
1st  Young rider classification
1st Stage 1
 1st Stage 2 Tour du Loiret
 6th Road race, UEC European Under-23 Road Championships
 10th Overall Tour of Yancheng Coastal Wetlands
 10th Coppa dei Laghi-Trofeo Almar
2017
 4th Road race, National Road Championships
2018
 Tour of Thailand
1st  Points classification
1st Stages 4, 5 & 6
 1st Stage 8 Tour of Japan
 4th Overall Baltic Chain Tour
1st Stage 1
2019
 Tour of Taiyuan
1st  Points classification
1st Stages 2, 3, 5 & 6
 Tour de Korea
1st Stages 2, 4 & 5
 1st Stage 6 Tour of Thailand
 2nd Grand Prix Minsk
 4th Road race, National Road Championships
2020
 Okolo Slovenska
1st  Points classification
1st Stages 1a & 3
2021
 1st Stage 2 Arctic Race of Norway
 2nd Overall Tour of Estonia
1st  Points classification
1st Stage 2
 3rd Clásica de Almería
 3rd Kampioenschap van Vlaanderen
2022
 2nd Overall Baltic Chain Tour
1st  Points classification
1st Stages 2 & 4
 5th Road race, National Road Championships

Grand Tour general classification results timeline

References

External links

 

1993 births
Living people
Estonian male cyclists
European Games competitors for Estonia
Cyclists at the 2015 European Games
Cyclists at the 2019 European Games
Sportspeople from Tartu